The Fungies! is an American animated comedy television series created by Stephen P. Neary for HBO Max. The first part of the first season premiered on August 20, 2020, on HBO Max, followed by the second part of the season on October 8, 2020. The series made its linear premiere on Cartoon Network on June 4, 2021.

Premise 
The Fungies! is set in a prehistoric and mythological metropolis of Fungietown in a strange prehistoric world inhabited by some fungi-looking creatures and occasional dinosaurs. The series follows the adventures of Seth, one of the town's young mushroom inhabitants, whose love for scientific adventures often ends with him stirring trouble with the local inhabitants and learning to understand others.

Cast 
 Harry Teitelman as Seth
 Zaela Rae as Claudette
 Justin Michael as Nevin
 Niki Yang as Lil' Lemon
 Grace Kaufman as Champsa, Holk
 Sam Richardson as Cool James, Mr. Mayor
 Stephen P. Neary as Pascal, Sir Tree
 Edi Patterson as Mertha, Anna Nanna
 Tama Brutsche as The Twins
 Jennifer Coolidge as Dr. Nancy
 Terry Gross as Pam
 Mary Faber as Teacher Terry
 June Squibb as Granny Grancie
 Chris Diamantopoulos as Commander Beefy
 Eric Edelstein as Coach Croach

Episodes

Series overview

Season 1 (2020)

Season 2 (2021)

Season 3 (2021)

Development 
The show was originally developed as The Fancies as part of the Cartoon Network International Artists Program, and was greenlight for a series in July 2019. The first season premiered on August 20, 2020 on HBO Max.

International broadcast 
In the United Kingdom, it premiered on Cartoon Network on November 2, 2020. In Canada, it premiered on Teletoon on January 10, 2021.

Cancellation 
In August 2022, upon the announcement that HBO Max would be removing the series that month, it was reported that the series had concluded after its third season, which was released on December 16, 2021.

Reception 
Common Sense Media rated the show at 4/5 stars, stating that "The silliness will draw kids in, but parents will appreciate all the great stuff secretly woven through each episode." Mashable also gave a favorable review, writing that it had "perfect balance between the soft, safe world of children's programming and the deadpan absurdism of emotional exhaustion — y'know, but with mushrooms. And dinosaurs. And, oh yeah, that talking stump."

References

External links

2020s American animated television series
2020s American children's comedy television series
2020 American television series debuts
2021 American television series endings
American children's animated adventure television series
American children's animated comedy television series
American children's animated fantasy television series
English-language television shows
Television series by Cartoon Network Studios
HBO Max original programming
Cartoon Network original programming
Animated television series about children